The Dragon Tamers, also known as Belles of Taekwondo, is a 1975 Hong Kong martial arts film directed by John Woo and starring James Tien, Carter Wong and Kim Chang-suk. This is the second feature-length film to be directed by Woo, following The Young Dragons in 1974.

This action picture from Golden Harvest was filmed in South Korea. The stunt choreographer, Chuan Chen, had been a recognized talent at Golden Harvest, having worked on many of their films. His assistant on this particular production was Jackie Chan.

Cast
James Tien as Nan Kung
Carter Wong as Fang
Kim Chang-suk as Sheng Ming-mei
Ji Han-jae as Master Sheng
Yeung Wai as Yuan (younger)
Kim Ki-ju as Yuan (elder)
Chan Chuen as Yuan's top fighter
Hsu Hsia as Yuan's thug
Yuen Wah as a student beaten by Nan
Chik Ngai-hung as Yuan's thug 
Lee Ye-min	 	 
Martin Chui 
Jang Jeong-kuk	 	 
Ina Ryoko	 	 
Kobayashi Chie	 	 
Saijo Nami	 	 
Hara Keiko	 	 
Park Seong-jae	 	 
Lee Dae-yeob as Master Pai
Woo Yeon-jeong as a woman in love with Nan Kung
Tam Bo	 	 
Kim Wang-kuk as a man defeated by Yuans
Lee Joo-keun	 	 
Ho Choi-yat

References

External links
 
 Hong Kong Movie Database entry
 City On Fire Entry
  HKMDB Chuan Chen Entry

1975 films
1975 action films
1975 martial arts films
Films directed by John Woo
Hong Kong action films
Hong Kong martial arts films
Taekwondo films
1970s Mandarin-language films
Golden Harvest films
Films shot in South Korea
1970s Hong Kong films